Georgette Reed (born 26 January 1967) is a Canadian former athlete. She competed in the women's shot put at the 1992 Summer Olympics. She is the daughter of former Saskatchewan Roughriders football player George Reed.

References

External links
 
 

1967 births
Living people
Athletes (track and field) at the 1992 Summer Olympics
Canadian female shot putters
Canadian female discus throwers
Olympic track and field athletes of Canada
Athletes (track and field) at the 1994 Commonwealth Games
Commonwealth Games competitors for Canada
Athletes (track and field) at the 1991 Pan American Games
Athletes (track and field) at the 1995 Pan American Games
Pan American Games track and field athletes for Canada
World Athletics Championships athletes for Canada
Canadian people of African-American descent
Black Canadian female track and field athletes
Athletes from Regina, Saskatchewan